South Coast is a name often given to coastal areas to the south of a geographical region or major metropolitan area.

Geographical

Australia
South Coast (New South Wales), the coast of New South Wales, Australia, south of Sydney
 South Coast (Queensland), the historic name of the Gold Coast, Queensland
South coast of Western Australia, from Cape Leeuwin to Eucla, Western Australia

Canada
 Ontario's South Coast, a descriptor used for marketing purposes by Norfolk County, Ontario
South Coast, British Columbia, a subregion of the British Columbia Coast

India
Southern part of Coastal India
Coromandel coast, south-eastern India
Malabar coast, south-western India

Indonesia
South Coast Regency, West Sumatra

South Africa
KwaZulu-Natal South Coast, in KwaZulu-Natal province 
 Southcoast Mall, a shopping centre in Shelly Beach on the KwaZulu-Natal South Coast

United States
South Coast (California)
South Coast AVA, a designated American viticultural Area in Southern California
South Coast Plaza, a shopping mall in Costa Mesa, California
South Coast (Massachusetts), a marketing term referring to the coastline of southeast Massachusetts from Wareham to Swansea

Other uses
South Coast (hotel and casino) is the former name of a hotel and casino in Las Vegas, Nevada.
South Coast (album) recorded by Ramblin' Jack Elliott
 South Coast, a song by The Kingston Trio on their album ...From the Hungry i

See also
Gulf Coast of the United States